Mark P. Hughes is the Grand Prix editor for Motor Sport magazine, a position he has held since the start of 2014. He is also an F1 correspondent for The Sunday Times and technical editor for the renowned motor racing annual, Autocourse. Hughes also provides analysis for British television coverage of Formula One, currently working in the role of technical analyst for Sky Sports following his previous role as commentary box producer for the BBC's coverage, in case commentators David Coulthard and Martin Brundle miss anything on track. He worked in a similar role for ITV when they had the rights to F1, assisting Brundle and James Allen. He has also written articles that have been published in The Daily Telegraph.

When Hughes worked for Autosport his Formula One race reports were widely acclaimed for their combination of cockpit insight, technical understanding and vivid prose; veteran motorsport author Eoin Young has described Hughes as "a talent with an amazing (...)ability", and has compared him to Ernest Hemingway.

Hughes has had several F1-related books published. Speed Addicts (published by HarperCollins) was awarded ‘Best Illustrated Book’ at the 2006 British Sports Book Awards. Mark Hughes is also the author of the 2008 book Lewis Hamilton, The Full Story.

His co-authored book with racing driver Tommy Byrne, Crashed And Byrned, won the 2008 William Hill Irish Sports Book of the Year.

His brother is the racing driver Warren Hughes, and he is married.

References

Year of birth missing (living people)
Living people
English sportswriters
English motorsport people
Formula One journalists and reporters